Carol Duckworth is an English international lawn and indoor bowler.

Bowls career
Duckworth played international bowls for Zambia before switching allegiance to England. In 2002, she was part of the gold medal winning team in the fours at the 2002 Commonwealth Games in Manchester along with Ellen Alexander, Shirley Page and Gill Mitchell.

Duckworth has also won a national championship representing Braintree Bowling Club and Essex and became a pairs British champion after winning the 1998 pairs at the British Isles Bowls Championships.

References

Living people
1940 births
Commonwealth Games medallists in lawn bowls
Commonwealth Games gold medallists for England
English female bowls players
Bowls players at the 2002 Commonwealth Games
Medallists at the 2002 Commonwealth Games